DYCD (103.5 FM), broadcasting as 103.5 Retro Cebu, is a radio station owned and operated by Ditan Communications, a subsidiary of UM Broadcasting Network. The station's studio and offices are located at Room 309, 3rd Floor, Doña Luisa Bldg., Fuente Osmeña, Cebu City, and its transmitter is located at Brgy. Kalunasan, Cebu City. This station operates 24/7.

History

1995-2002: Kiss FM

This station was established in 1995 as Kiss FM 103.5, carrying a Top 40 format. It was then located at the 4th level of Ayala Center Cebu.

2002-2015: Wild FM
Wild FM Cebu used to be on 105.9 MHz under the call letters DYWC from 1994 to 2000. In August 2002, UMBN acquired the station from Ditan Communications and relaunched the station as 103.5 Wild FM with its first site at the University of San Carlos main campus along Pelaez St. Wild FM's unique Contemporary Hit Radio (CHR-Dance) format with 20-minute nonstop re-mix every hour soon got Cebuanos shaking and dancing. This not-so-secret formula is the key to Wild FM's air dominance in every area that it operates in, a driving, pulsating beat partnered with a dynamic deejay and spinner.

On March 27, 2005, Wild FM moved to a new site at Doña Luisa Bldg., Fuente Osmeña, uptown Cebu to get closer to the listeners and clients.

On late January 2015, after almost 12 years on the air, Wild FM quietly ended its broadcast and went off the air for a month.

2015-present: Retro Cebu
On March 16, 2015, the station resumed its broadcast as 103.5 Retro Cebu, this time playing classic hits. In a span of a few months, this station's format change became hugely successful to retro music fanatics and it became a hit. A year later, the Retro was adapted by its Davao station.

References

Radio stations in Metro Cebu
Radio stations established in 1995